Tathiodon is an extinct genus of Late Jurassic (Kimmeridgian - Tithonian) mammal from the Morrison Formation.
Present in stratigraphic zone 5.

See also

 Prehistoric mammal
 List of prehistoric mammals
 Paleobiota of the Morrison Formation

References

 Foster, J. (2007). Jurassic West: The Dinosaurs of the Morrison Formation and Their World. Indiana University Press. 389pp.

Dryolestida
Morrison mammals
Fossil taxa described in 1927
Prehistoric mammal genera